Stade René Pleven d'Akpakpa is a multi-use stadium in Cotonou, Littoral Department, Benin. It is currently used mostly for football matches and is used as the home stadium of Requins de l'Atlantique FC. The stadium has a capacity of 15,000 people.

References

Football venues in Benin
Buildings and structures in Cotonou
Requins de l'Atlantique FC